The Nashville metropolitan area (officially, the Nashville-Davidson–Murfreesboro–Franklin, TN Metropolitan Statistical Area) is a metropolitan statistical area centered on Nashville, Tennessee, the capital and largest city in Tennessee, in the United States. With a population of just over 2 million, it is the most populous metropolitan area in Tennessee. It is also the largest metropolitan area in Tennessee, in terms of land area.

The Office of Management and Budget defines the metro area for statistical use by the United States Census Bureau and other agencies. The area is the 35th largest metropolitan area in the United States. The metropolitan statistical area was first designated in 1950 and initially included only Davidson County. As surrounding counties increased in population and densities and in the number of their residents employed in Davidson County, the OMB added new counties to the MSA. Today, the metro area includes Davidson and 12 other counties.

Geography 
The Nashville metropolitan area is located in the central part of the state of Tennessee, entirely within the Grand Division of Middle Tennessee, as defined by state law. Both the geographical center and population center of Tennessee are found in Murfreesboro, the second-largest city in the metropolitan area. Geologically, the metropolitan area covers most of the Nashville Basin, a geological dome. Parts of the region extend onto the Highland Rim, an elevated plain which completely surrounds the Nashville Basin. Both of these physiographic provinces are part of the Interior Low Plateaus of the Interior Plains. The region is characterized by a combination of uneven rolling hills and relatively level plains, and is underlain with porous sedimentary bedrock such as limestone, sandstone, and shale, which form karst. As a result, the region contains many caves, underground streams, and depressions, and sinkholes are a common problem in the region.

Nashville is located in the northwestern corner of the basin, and most of Nashville's suburban growth has occurred to the south, southeast, east, and northeast of the city, due to the more level terrain of the basin. Much of the metro area contains extremely fertile soils, and crops such as corn and tobacco are commonly grown in the more rural parts of the metropolitan area. The Cumberland River passes through central part of the region, and is served by several tributaries, including the Stones, Harpeth, Caney Fork, and Red rivers. A small portion of the southern part of the metropolitan area, including most of Maury County, is within the drainage basin of the Tennessee River. A small part of the northern part of the region is within the Green River watershed. The Nashville metropolitan area is one of the most biodiverse inland regions in the United States, and is home to extremely rare ecosystems known as cedar glades, which are found in areas with shallow limestone bedrock that is largely barren of overlying soil, and are also one of the most endangered ecosystems in the nation, due to the rapid growth of the region.

Metropolitan area cities and towns

Places with over 500,000 inhabitants 

Nashville (Principal city)

Places with over 100,000 inhabitants 

Murfreesboro

Places with 10,000 to 100,000 inhabitants 

Brentwood
Columbia
Dickson
Franklin
Gallatin
Goodlettsville
Hartsville
Hendersonville
Nolensville
La Vergne
Lebanon
Mount Juliet
Portland
Smyrna
Spring Hill
Springfield
White House

Places with 1,000 to 10,000 inhabitants 

Ashland City
Belle Meade
Burns
Carthage
Charlotte
Christiana (CDP)
Coopertown
Cross Plains
Fairview
Forest Hills
Gordonsville
Greenbrier
Green Hill (CDP)
Kingston Springs
Lafayette
Lakewood
Millersville
Mount Pleasant
Oak Hill
Pegram
Pleasant View
Red Boiling Springs
Ridgetop
Rockvale (CDP)
Rural Hill (CDP)
South Carthage
Thompson's Station
Watertown
Westmoreland
White Bluff
Woodbury

Places with fewer than 1,000 inhabitants 

Adams
Auburntown
Bethpage (CDP)
Berry Hill
Cedar Hill
Eagleville
Mitchellville
Orlinda
Slayden
Vanleer
Walterhill (CDP)

Counties

Combined Statistical Area 
The Nashville-Davidson–Murfreesboro, TN, Combined Statistical Area (CSA) is the result of the addition of the Micropolitan Statistical Areas of Shelbyville (Bedford County), Lawrenceburg (Lawrence County) and Lewisburg (Marshall County) to the Nashville-Davidson–Murfreesboro–Franklin, TN, Metropolitan Statistical Area. The  population of the CSA as of the 2020 United States census was 2,118,233.

Transportation 
Three major interstate highways serve the Nashville metropolitan area, converging in downtown Nashville as a contiguous freeway loop. Most of the rapid growth of the Nashville metropolitan area has occurred along three major interstate highway corridors. Interstate 40 runs in an east-to-west direction, and connecting the region to Memphis to the west and Knoxville to the east. Interstate 65 runs north to south, and connects to Huntsville, Alabama to the south and Louisville, Kentucky to the north. Interstate 24, while technically an east-west interstate, runs in a northwest-to-southeast orientation, connecting the region to Clarksville to the northwest and Chattanooga to the southeast. Within the metro area, I-40 serves a suburban corridor that consists of the eastern neighborhoods of Nashville, including Donelson and Hermitage, and the cities of Mount Juliet and Lebanon. I-24 serves the suburban areas of Antioch, La Vergne, Smyrna, and Murfreesboro to the southeast, which is both the most populated and, in general, is the most congested corridor in the region. The I-65 corridor to the south consists of the suburban cities of Oak Hill, Berry Hill, Brentwood, and Franklin, and I-65 also serves the Nashville suburbs of Goodlettsville, Hendersonville, and Millersville to the north. Interstate 440 serves as a southern bypass around downtown Nashville, and Interstate 840 is an outer southern bypass around Nashville. State Route 155 (SR 155, Briley Parkway) is a freeway that bypasses downtown Nashville to the north and provides access to a number of tourist attractions including the Grand Ole Opry. SR 386 (Vietnam Veterans Boulevard) is a freeway that serves the suburbs of Hendersonville and Gallatin, and SR 396 connects Spring Hill to I-65.

References

External links 
February 2013 delineations of metropolitan and combined statistical areas
U.S. Census Bureau State & County QuickFacts
U.S. Census Bureau population estimates
Metropolitan and Micropolitan Statistical Areas
About Metropolitan and Micropolitan Statistical Areas
Historical Metropolitan Area Definitions

 
Metropolitan areas of Tennessee
Middle Tennessee